Saheb Biwi Aur Gangster Returns is a 2013 Indian romantic thriller drama film directed by Tigmanshu Dhulia.  It is the sequel to the 2011 film, Saheb, Biwi Aur Gangster and the second installment of the Saheb, Biwi Aur Gangster film series. The film stars Jimmy Sheirgill and Mahi Gill, who reprised their roles from the previous film, while new additions to the cast include Irrfan Khan and Soha Ali Khan. The film was released on 8 March 2013. Jimmy Shergill won Best Actor Award for this film at 11th Norway Bollywood Film Festival in Oslo. A sequel titled Saheb, Biwi Aur Gangster 3 was released on 27 July 2018 and got poor reviews because of its poor script and weak plotlines.

Plot
The Royal Scandal, the war for power, and fight for money continue with the return of Saheb Biwi Aur Gangster. Aditya Pratap Singh is crippled and is trying to recover from the physical disability and his wife's betrayal. The lover cum seductress Madhavi Devi is now an MLA, her relationship with Aditya may have broken to shambles but her relation with alcohol is deep, dark and daunting. Indrajeet Singh (Irrfan Khan), a ragged prince who has lost everything but his pride, pledges to get back his family's respect which was once destroyed by Aditya's ancestors. Ranjana is a modern ambitious girl who is madly in love with Indrajeet Singh. The story takes a new turn when Aditya falls in love with Ranjana and forces Birendra, her father, for their marriage.

Cast
Jimmy Sheirgill as Aditya Pratap Singh / Sahab
Mahi Gill as Madhavi Devi
Irrfan Khan as Indrajeet Pratap Singh aka Raja Bhaiyya
Soha Ali Khan as Ranjana
Pravesh Rana as Param Pratap Singh
Deepraj Rana as Kanhaiya
Raj Babbar as Birendra Pratap aka Bunny
Rajiv Gupta as MLA Prabhu Tiwari
Charanpreet Singh as A journalist
Sujay Shankarwar as Rudy
Anjana Sukhani as item number
Mugdha Godse in an item number "Media Se"
Santosh Maurya as Thakur

Production

Casting
The sequel was announced following the huge critical success of the first part, Saheb Biwi Aur Gangster.  It was announced that Jimmy Sheirgill and Mahi Gill would be reprising their roles from the original film. In January 2012, Neil Nitin Mukesh was signed on to play the new gangster.  However, due to differences between Mukesh and the film's producers, Mukesh was dropped from the part and Irrfan Khan was cast instead. Later in March, Soha Ali Khan was confirmed to play Irrfan Khan's love interest. Raj Babbar was soon cast to play the role of Soha Ali's father. Actress Neha Dhupia was to appear in an item number, but due to date issues, Mugdha Godse was signed instead.

Filming
Filming began in April 2012 in Gujarat in Santarampur and Devgadh Baria of panchmahals district and was wrapped up in October 2012, working on an intended budget of Rs 70 million.

Release
The film was released on 8 March 2013.

Critical reception
The film was well-received by critics. The performances of the main cast and the dialogues especially met with universal acclaim.

Taran Adarsh of Bollywood Hungama gave the film 3.5/5 stars praising the performances of the main cast and the intricate character developments. 
Raja Sen of Rediff.com gave the film 4/5 stars and said Saheb. Biwi Aur Gangster Returns is better, sharper and more assured than the prequel.  He called the dialogues "applause seeking" and also added, "Saheb Biwi Aur Gangster Returns is a theatrically indulgent entertainer, one that makes no bones about its pulpiness and stays well and truly juicy." 
Ananya Bhattacharya of Zee News gave the film 4/5 stars and called it a 'masterpiece'. 
Anupama Chopra of Hindustan Times gave the film 3/5 stars saying that the film should be seen for its characters and dialogue.
Rajeev Masand of IBN Live gave the film 3/5 stars saying that the film is an engaging watch.
Rummana Ahmed from Yahoo India awarded the film 4.5/5 stars, praising Irrfan Khan's performance and calling the film overall "a compelling watch".

Box office
It eventually netted  in domestic market. It managed $15,000 from overseas. The movie worldwide grossed .

Soundtrack

The film's soundtrack was released on 10 February 2013. The album contains five songs composed by Sandeep Chowta and lyrics penned by Sandeep Nath. A bonus song was later added to the film cut, "Dukh Thor Ditte Jugni", by music director Mukhtar Sahota, which became the opening song of the film.

Track list

Sequel
After two successful films director and producer planned a third installment of this series. Saheb, Biwi Aur Gangster 3 released on July 27, 2018.

References

External links

2010s Hindi-language films
Indian sequel films
Films scored by Mukhtar Sahota
Films scored by Sandeep Chowta
2013 masala films
Indian gangster films
Viacom18 Studios films
Films directed by Tigmanshu Dhulia